Kawabe Station is the name of two train stations in Japan.

 Kawabe Station (Aomori) - (川部駅) in Minami Tsugaru District, Aomori Prefecture
 Kawabe Station (Akita) - (川辺駅) in Yurihonjō, Akita Prefecture